Kofeysheh (also known as Kūfeysheh and Kūmnīsheh) is a village in Gharb-e Karun Rural District, in the Central District of Khorramshahr County, Khuzestan Province, Iran. At the 2006 census, its population was 366, in 68 families.

References 

Populated places in Khorramshahr County